The 1965–66 North Carolina Tar Heels men's basketball team represented the University of North Carolina at Chapel Hill during the 1965–66 men's college basketball season. This was the first season that North Carolina played its home games at Carmichael Auditorium.

Schedule

References

North Carolina Tar Heels men's basketball seasons
North Carolina
Tar
Tar